Chardon Township is one of the sixteen townships of Geauga County, Ohio, United States. As of the 2010 census the population was 4,591.

Geography
Located in the northern part of the county, it borders the following townships and municipalities:
Concord Township, Lake County - north
Hambden Township - east
Chardon - southeast
Munson Township - south
Chester Township - southwest corner
Kirtland - west
Kirtland Hills - northwest

Chardon, the county seat of Geauga County, borders Chardon Township on the southeast.

Government
The township is governed by a three-member board of trustees, who are elected in November of odd-numbered years to a four-year term beginning on the following January 1. Two are elected in the year after the presidential election and one is elected in the year before it. There is also an elected township fiscal officer, who serves a four-year term beginning on April 1 of the year after the election, which is held in November of the year before the presidential election. Vacancies in the fiscal officership or on the board of trustees are filled by the remaining trustees.

Notable residents
 Joe Jurevicius, wide receiver for the Cleveland Browns
 Ettore Boiardi, better known as Chef Boyardee

References

External links
County website

Townships in Geauga County, Ohio
Townships in Ohio